Thomas Mann (1875–1955) was a German author, essayist, and Nobel Prize laureate.

Thomas Mann may also refer to:

 Thomas Mann (actor) (born 1991), American actor, Project X
 Thomas Mann (artist) (born 1947), American jewelry artist
 Thomas Mann (German politician) (born 1946), German politician (CDU) and Member of the European Parliament
 Thomas Mann (Iowa politician) (born 1949), American politician in the state of Iowa
 Thomas C. Mann (1912–1999), United States diplomat in Latin America
 Thomas E. Mann (born 1944), United States political scientist and author
 Thomas P. Mann (born 1965), Justice of the Supreme Court of Virginia
 Tom Mann (1856–1941), British trade unionist and socialist

See also
 Thomann (retailer), a German-based retailer of musical instruments